Markus Kessler (born 18 May 1992) is a Swiss rower. He competed in the 2020 Summer Olympics.

References

1992 births
Living people
Swiss male rowers
Olympic rowers of Switzerland
Rowers at the 2020 Summer Olympics
People from Schaffhausen
Sportspeople from the canton of Schaffhausen
21st-century Swiss people